Tungabhadra Pushkaram is a festival of River Tungabhadra  normally occurs once in 12 years. This Pushkaram is observed for a period  of 12 days from the time of entry of Jupiter into Makara rasi (Capricorn).

Details of locations
The places on the banks of the Tungabhadra River where pilgrims visit famous temples are in the Alampur, Jogulamba Gadwal district of Telangana and Kurnool district of Andhra Pradesh. The notable places are Hospet, Hampi, Kampli, Mantralayam, Kurnool, Alampur.

See also
Godavari Pushkaralu
Kumbh Mela
Pushkaram

References

Festivals in India
Water and Hinduism
Hindu festivals
Religious tourism in India
Hindu pilgrimages
Jogulamba Gadwal district
Kurnool
Festivals in Andhra Pradesh
Festivals in Telangana
Festivals in Karnataka
November observances
December observances
2008 in India
2020 in India
Tourist attractions in Kadapa district
1996 in India

2020s in Andhra Pradesh